The Carajás Mountains or Serra dos Carajás are a mountain range to the west of the municipality of Marabá in the Pará state of Brazil. Monte Redenção, Marabá's highest point, is located there.

The mountains are contained in the Carajás National Forest, a  sustainable use conservation unit created in 1998 that includes mining operations in a huge deposit of high-grade iron ore.

See also
Carajás Mine
S11D

References

Further reading 
 Newton Pereira de Rezende, Carajás: memórias da descoberta, Editora Gráfica Stamppa, 2009, 316 pg. Book in Portuguese telling the history of Carajás' iron mines' discovery.

Mountain ranges of Brazil
Landforms of Pará